A choc ice is the British English term for a generic frozen dessert generally consisting of a rectangular block of ice cream—typically vanilla flavour—which is thinly coated with chocolate. In many countries, there are numerous versions of this dessert which are produced under many different brand names.

A notable American brand is Klondike, which was introduced in the United States in 1922 and was named after the Klondike River in Alaska and Canada.

The term 'choc ice' has also become a racial slur used to describe any person who is figuratively 'black on the outside, white on the inside'.

References 

Ice cream

cs:Nanuk
sk:Nanuk